The following timeline traces the territorial evolution of California, the thirty-first state admitted to the United States of America, including the process of removing Indigenous Peoples from their native lands, or restricting them to reservations.

Timeline

Indigenous & territorial claims prior to 1768
Indigenous peoples of California, see Before 1768 map
Broad early European edicts and treaties that unknowingly included the land that would later become California
Inter caetera papal bull issued by Pope Alexander VI, 1493
Treaty of Tordesillas, 1494
Vasco Núñez de Balboa claims South Sea (Pacific Ocean) and all adjoining lands for Spain, 1513
Treaty of Saragossa, 1529
Early European claims on California soil
 San Miguel (San Diego) claim made by Juan Rodríguez Cabrillo on behalf of Spain, 1542 
 New Albion ( Point Reyes) claim made by Sir Francis Drake on behalf of England, 1579

Spanish period (1768-1821)
 Las Californias claimed by Spain under the governance of the Viceroyalty of New Spain, 1768–1804
Spanish missions in California, 1769-1833
Relocation of Mission Indians, 1769-1834
Spanish rancho land grants, 1769-1821
Peace of Paris, 1783
Alta California Province established, 1804–1821
Fort Ross established by the Russian-American Company, 1812-1842
 Northern California coast claimed by Ivan Kuskov on behalf of Russia, 1812
Adams-Onis Treaty of 1819
Mexican War of Independence, 1808-1821
 Monterey, California held by Hippolyte Bouchard on behalf of Argentina (6 days), 1818
Treaty of Córdoba signed August 21, 1821

Mexican period (1821-1848)
Alta California Province transferred to Mexico after Treaty of Córdoba, 1821-1824
 Army of the Three Guarantees, 1821
Mexican rancho land grants, 1821-1846
 First Mexican Empire, 1821-1823
Provisional Government of Mexico, 1823-1824
 First Mexican Republic, 1824-1835
Alta California Territory established via the 1824 Constitution of Mexico, 1824–1836
Treaty of Limits (Mexico–United States), 1828
Mexican secularization act of 1833
Centralist Republic of Mexico, 1835-1846
 California's Lone Star coup and declaration of independence, 1836
Las Californias Department established by Las Siete Leyes (The Seven Laws), 1836-1846
Second Federal Republic of Mexico, 1846-1848
Alta California Territory reestablished when 1824 Constitution of Mexico was restored, 1846-1848
Mexican–American War, 1846–1848
 California Republic (25 days), 1846
U.S. military government of California, 1846–1849
Treaty of Cahuenga signed January 13, 1847
Treaty of Guadalupe Hidalgo signed February 2, 1848
Mexican Cession of 1848

American period (1848-present)
 Alta California administered by the United States as part of the Mexican Cession Unorganized territory, 1848-1850
Provisional government of California, 1849–1850
State of Deseret (extralegal), 1849–1850
Constitution of California (see California Constitutional Boundaries), October 13, 1849
Compromise of 1850
State of California since 1850
 California Statehood Act, September 9, 1850
Act for the Government and Protection of Indians, April 22, 1850
California Indian Wars, 1850-1880
Aboriginal title in California, 1851-present
California Land Act of 1851
California Indian Reservations and Cessions, 1851-1892
Indian Reorganization Act of 1934
Indian Claims Act of 1946
California Act of 1949
California Rancheria Termination Acts, 1956-present
California-Nevada border disputes, 1856-1980
Nataqua Territory, 1856-1861
Roop County dispute, 1861-1864
California-Oregon border dispute, 1868-present

California Constitutional Boundaries
CONSTITUTION OF THE STATE OF CALIFORNIA (1849)

Article XII; Boundary

The Boundary of the State of California shall be as follows:
Commencing at this point of intersection of 42d degree of north latitude with the 120th degree of longitude west from Greenwich, and running south on the line of said 120th degree of west longitude until it intersects the 39th degree of north latitude; thence running in a straight line in a south easterly direction to the River Colorado, at a point where it intersects the 35th degree of north latitude; thence down the middle of the channel of said river, to the boundary line between the United States and Mexico, as established by the Treaty of May 30th, 1848; thence running west and along said boundary line to the Pacific Ocean, and extending therein three English miles; thence running in a northwesterly direction, and following the direction of the Pacific Coast to the 42d degree of north latitude, thence on the line of said 42d degree of north latitude to the place of beginning. Also all the islands, harbors, and bays, along adjacent to the Pacific Coast.

See also
Aboriginal title in the United States
History of California
Historical outline of California
Conquest of California
Flag of California
California Genocide
An Act for the Admission of the State of California
Partition and secession in California
Yes California
Territorial evolution of North America since 1763
Territorial evolution of Mexico
Territorial evolution of the United States
 Territorial evolution of Arizona
 Territorial evolution of Nevada
 Territorial evolution of Oregon
Laws of the Indies
Encomienda
New Laws

References

Footnotes

Citations

External links
State of California website
California Historical Society
California History

California
Wikipedia outlines

History of the West Coast of the United States
California
California
Geography of California